Love Shines is a documentary film about Canadian songwriter Ron Sexsmith by filmmaker Douglas Arrowsmith. The film is produced by Paperny Entertainment and commissioned by The Movie Network and Movie Central with funding from Astral Media's Harold Greenberg Fund and the Rogers Documentary Fund.

It was nominated for three Canadian Screen Awards in 2013 for Best Performing Arts Program or Series or Arts Documentary Program or Series, Best Direction in a Performing Arts Program or Series, and Best Picture Editing in a Documentary Program or Series.

Synopsis
Love Shines follows Ron Sexsmith as he attempts to turn his niche following into mainstream success by recording his album Long Player Late Bloomer with legendary producer Bob Rock.

Release dates
Love Shines had its world premiere as a "special presentation" at the 2010 Vancouver International Film Festival and won audience awards at SXSW 2011 and the 2011 Maui Film Festival.  It also screened at the 2011 Hot Docs Festival in Toronto.  It debuted on television on BBC Four in March 2011 and on HBO Canada in May 2011.

Subjects interviewed
Ron Sexsmith – singer, songwriter
Steve Earle – singer, songwriter and producer
Elvis Costello – singer, songwriter
Leslie Feist – singer, songwriter
Tony Ferguson – vice president of Interscope Records
Daniel Lanois – producer (U2, Bob Dylan, Emmylou Harris)
Bob Rock – producer (Metallica, Bon Jovi, Mötley Crüe)
Rob Bowman – Grammy Award–winning professor, author and critic
Kiefer Sutherland – actor, co–owner of Ironworks Studios
Michael Dixon – Ron Sexsmith's manager
Colleen Hixenbaugh – Ron Sexsmith's wife
Christopher Sexsmith – Ron Sexsmith's son
Dorothy Grodesky – Ron Sexsmith's mother

See also
Bob Rock
Long Player Late Bloomer
Paperny Entertainment

References

External links
 

2010 films
English-language Canadian films
Canadian documentary television films
2010 documentary films
Documentary films about singers
Canadian Screen Award-winning television shows
2010s English-language films
2010s Canadian films